Eric Verso (born October 4, 1992) is an American soccer player.

Career

College
Verso spent his entire college career at Stanford University.  He made a total of 72 appearances for the Cardinal and tallied 12 goals and 19 assists. His 13 assists in his senior year helped Stanford to the 2015 NCAA National Championship.

Professional
On January 14, 2016, Verso was selected in the second round (34th overall) of the 2016 MLS SuperDraft by Montreal Impact. However, he wasn't signed by the club.  On June 11, 2016, Verso signed with United Soccer League side Rio Grande Valley FC Toros. He made his professional debut the following day as a 71st-minute substitute in a 3-0 win over Oklahoma City Energy.

References

External links
Stanford bio

1992 births
Living people
American soccer players
Stanford Cardinal men's soccer players
Rio Grande Valley FC Toros players
Association football midfielders
Soccer players from California
CF Montréal draft picks
USL Championship players